ROKS Choe Yeong is a  in the South Korean navy. The ship is named after Choe Yeong.

In January 2011 she saw action when she pursued a chemical tanker captured by Somali pirates. The tanker was retaken with eight pirates killed and five captured. Later in 2011 she evacuated South Korean nationals stranded in Libya.

Design 
The KDX-II is part of a much larger build up program aimed at turning the ROKN into a blue-water navy. It is said to be the first stealthy major combatant in the ROKN and was designed to significantly increase the ROKN's capabilities.

Construction and career
ROKS Choe Yeong is a Chungmugong Yi Sun-sin-class destroyer and entered service in 2006.

Choe Yeong was assigned to patrol the Northern Limit Line in November 2009 after a boundary dispute clash with North Korea, the first of its kind in seven years.

2011 rescue operation

On 15 January 2011, the Norwegian-owned chemical tanker  was captured by Somali pirates while en route from the United Arab Emirates to Sri Lanka. The South Korean operator of the vessel, the Samho Shipping Company, was facing huge losses because it was obligated to continue paying Norwegian investors under its charter even while the vessel was held by pirates. However, the Norwegian government had no military presence in the area at the time. Eight South Koreans were among the 21 crewmembers being held hostage.

The South Korean government dispatched Choe Yeong, under Captain Cho Young-joo, commander of the Cheonghae Anti-piracy Unit. Choe Yeong pursued Samho Jewelry for nearly a week until the pirates aboard the tanker were fatigued. Several fake attacks were staged to exhaust the pirate crew. When some of the pirates left the ship to attempt another hijacking on a nearby Mongolian vessel, commandos from the Republic of Korea Naval Special Warfare Brigade boarded Samho Jewelry while a Westland Lynx helicopter provided covering fire. Communications jamming was utilized to prevent the pirates from calling for assistance. The tanker was retaken with eight pirates killed and five captured. The captain of Samho Jewelry survived a gunshot wound to the stomach while three navy personnel suffered "light scratches". The rest of the tanker crew were unharmed.

Choe Yeong escorted Samho Jewelry to Oman, where they docked at the port of Muscat on 31 January. The rescue was called "a perfect military operation" by Lieutenant General Lee Sung-ho of the Joint Chiefs of Staff of the Republic of Korea.

2011 Libya evacuation

ROKS Choe Yeong was diverted from anti-piracy operations in the waters off of Somalia to evacuate South Korean nationals stranded in Libya. Choe Yeong successfully evacuated 32 South Korean nationals on 4 March and docked in the Maltese port of Valletta. Choe Yeong remained on standby near Libyan waters to support "further evacuation efforts."

2019 Jinhae Accident

ROKS Choe Yeong returned from a tour of duty with the Cheonghae Anti-piracy Unit on 24 May 2019. The ship was participating in a welcoming ceremony in the Jinhae Naval Base in Jinhae. While tightening a mooring line around 10:15 am KST, the rope snapped for currently unknown reasons. A petty officer second class died while receiving treatment, while four other sailors received non-life-threatening injuries.

2021 Strait of Hormuz Incident
The ROKS Choe Yeong was deployed to the Strait of Hormuz after Iranian maritime forces belonging to the IRGC seized a South Korean-flagged vessel.

See also
 Korean Destroyer eXperimental
 List of Republic of Korea Navy ships

References

Further reading

External links

 DDH-981 at KoreaDefence.net
 DDH-981 at Shipspotting.com

Chungmugong Yi Sun-shin-class destroyers
2006 ships
Ships built by Hyundai Heavy Industries Group